Senator Quitugua may refer to:

Franklin Quitugua (1933–2015), Guam Senate
Ignacio P. Quitugua (1909–1973), Guam Senate